God's Not Dead is the fifteenth studio album by the Christian band Newsboys. It was released on 15 November 2011 and is the second full-length album with lead singer Michael Tait. The album featured songs by Jared Anderson, Daniel Bashta, Jason Ingram, Reuben Morgan, Jennie Lee Riddle, Jonathan Lee, Sarah Hart, Ben Cantelon, Ben Glover, Norm Miller, as well as multiple compositions and arrangements by Seth Mosley of Me in Motion. The album produced one music video for the title track.

The album hit No. 1 on the Billboard Christian Albums chart, and its lead single, "God's Not Dead (Like a Lion)", originally written by Daniel Bashta, was certified Gold by the RIAA. As of 10 July 2014, the album has sold 428,000 copies.

Track listing

Personnel 
Newsboys
 Michael Tait – lead and backing vocals
 Jody Davis – guitars, backing vocals
 Jeff Frankenstein – keyboards, keyboard bass, programming
 Duncan Phillips – drums, percussion

Additional musicians
 Seth Mosley – keyboards, programming, strings, guitars, bass guitar, percussion, backing vocals 
 Todd Caldwell – keyboards, organ
 Brian Dexter – drums
 Steven Kadar – drums
 Jay Dawson – bagpipes
 David Henry – additional strings (12)
 Kevin Max – guest vocals (2, 12)

Production
 Seth Mosley – producer, engineer, editing 
 Wes Campbell – executive producer, art direction
 Dave Wagner – executive producer 
 Andrew Patton – A&R 
 Buckley Miller – engineer, editing, drum recording 
 Michael "X" O'Connor – drum recording
 F. Reid Shippen – mixing 
 Erik "Keller" Jahner – mix assistant
 Dave McNair – mastering 
 Kevin Miller – package design, layout 
 David Bean – photography 
 Lisa Wong-Ken – hair stylist, wardrobe, make-up

Charts

Weekly charts

Year-end charts

References

Newsboys albums
2011 albums
Inpop Records albums

pt:Born Again (Newsboys)